The following is a list of all 114 episodes of the television show Taxi.

All five seasons have been released on DVD by Paramount Home Entertainment (1–3) and CBS Home Entertainment (4–5, Complete Series).

Series overview

Episodes

Season 1 (1978–79)

Season 2 (1979–80)

Season 3 (1980–81)

Season 4 (1981–82)

Season 5 (1982–83)

References

External links

Lists of American sitcom episodes
Episodes